Domenico D'Ambrosio (born 18 July 1975) is a former Italian male long-distance runner who competed at five editions of the IAAF World Cross Country Championships at senior level (1997, 1998, 1999, 2001, 2003).

References

External links
 

1975 births
Living people
Italian male long-distance runners